The Enarei, singular Enaree, were Scythian androgynous/effeminate priests and shamanistic soothsayers who played an important role in the Scythian religion.

Name

Religious role
The  were affiliated to an orgiastic cult of the goddess Artimpasa in her form strongly influenced by Near Eastern fertility goddesses, and the rites of the  thus combined both indigenous Scythians religious practices of a shamanistic nature, which were themselves related to those of indigenous Siberian peoples, as well as ones imported from Levantine religions.

Rituals
The  used cannabis in their rituals, including both those of a communal and those of a funerary or psychopompic nature, thus being among the earliest spiritual practitioners to have used cannabis to achieve altered states of consciousness, implying that that an ancient connection existed between gender non-conforming spiritual practitioners and the use of mind-altering substances..

The  participated in Scythian funeral rituals, which included shamanic practises, and after the burial of the deceased, they would ritually cleanse themselves with the vapour of cannabis, which is attested archaeologically in Saka tombs from Siberia, which contained tripods, braziers, pelts, and charcoal containing remains of cannabis leaves and fruits, with one of the Pazyryk burials containing a pot, inside of which were cannabis fruits, as well as a copper censer used to burn cannabis.

Divination
The  also acted as seers and performed a particular form of divination which used the inner bark of the linden tree, unlike the methods of traditional Scythian soothsayers which used willow withies. The method of divination of the  consisted of cutting the inner linden bark into three pieces, and plaiting and unplaiting these pieces around their fingers to obtain answers.

The  were especially consulted when the king of the Scythians was ill, which was itself believed by the Scythians to be caused by a false oath being sworn upon the king's hearth. Once the  had identified the suspect who had sworn the false oath, the said suspect would claim to be innocent. If the  maintained the accusation, six more soothsayers were consulted, and if they upheld the original accusation, the suspect was executed by being beheaded. If the additional soothsayers declared the suspect was innocent, the process of consulting more soothsayers was repeated, and if the larger number of soothsayers still declared the suspect to be innocent, the initial accusers were executed by being put into a wagon filled with brushwood which was set on fire, and their sons were all killed.

Regalia
Like all ancient priesthoods, the  differentiated themselves from ordinary mortals through their dress, behaviour, and sacred rituals. Therefore, in addition to their transvestism, the  might also have worn additional regalia, such as drums used in shamanic rituals and antlered headdresses similar to those found in Saka horse burials and those worn in more recent times by Siberian shamans.

The rattling and tinkling of the sceptres' bells invited the audience to the impending rites.

Androgyny

Scythian origins

The institution of the  might have been influenced by the ancient traditions of Goddess worship and shamanism practised by the populations of the Eurasian steppe since the Palaeolithic. Such traditions of "gender-crossing shamanism," whereby men obtain the power of prophecy and of becoming religious figures possessed by spirits by abandoning their masculinity, have been preserved until recent times by indigenous Siberians.

West Asian influences
During the 7th century BC, the Scythians expanded into West Asia, during which time the Scythian religion was influenced by the religions of the peoples of the Fertile Crescent. The Scythians believed that the androgyny of the  originated during this period from a curse by the goddess Artimpasa to the perpetrators of the sack of the temple in ʾAšqalōn of the goddess , who was herself an androgynous vegetation-fertility goddess who was believed to have the ability to change men into women and women into men, and whom the Scythians identified with their own goddess Artimpasa; this curse was hereditary and was inherited by the descendants of the perpetrators of the sack.

Heredity

Sexuality
It is unknown whether the  practised ritual castration or merely refrained from heterosexual intercourse, although they were not celibate, and the writings of Pseudo-Hippokratēs concerning them suggest that they also played the receptive role during anal intercourse with men.

See also
Gala (priests)
Galli

References

Sources

Further reading 

 Davis-Kimball, Jeannine (1999). “Priestesses, Enarees, and Other Statuses Among Indo-Iranian Peoples.” In: Proceedings of the Tenth Annual UCLA Indo-European Conference: Los Angeles, May 21-23, 1998. Journal of Indo-European Studies Monograph Series number 32, edited by Karlene Jones-Bley, Martin E. Huld, Angela Della Volpe, and Miriam Robbins Dexter, 231-259. Washington, D.C.: Institute or the Study of Man.
  Accessed 21 Jan. 2023.
 "The Hippocratic Airs, Waters, Places on Cross-Dressing Eunuchs: "Natural" yet also "Divine"". In: Lieber, Elinor. Sex and Difference in Ancient Greece and Rome. Edinburgh: Edinburgh University Press, 2003. pp. 351-369. 
 "Scythian Priests and Siberian Shamans". In: Lincoln, Bruce. Apples and Oranges: Explorations In, On, and With Comparison. Chicago: University of Chicago Press, 2018. pp. 96-110. .

Scythian religion
Religious occupations
Priests
Third gender
Transgender topics and religion
Ancient LGBT history